Gloeopeziza is a genus of fungi in the family Helotiaceae. The genus contains 2 to 4 species.

References

Helotiaceae